Leon James may refer to:

 Leon James (composer) (born 1991), Indian film composer and singer
 Leon James (dancer) (died 1970), American Lindy Hop and jazz dancer
 Leon James (footballer) (born 2001), Thai footballer